Timothy Fontneau is a New Hampshire politician.

Political career
On November 8, 2016, Fontneau was elected to the New Hampshire House of Representatives where he represents the Strafford 7 district. Fontneau assumed office in 2016. Fontneau is a Democrat.

Personal life
Fontneau resides in Rochester, New Hampshire. Fontneau is married and has two children.

References

Living people
People from Rochester, New Hampshire
Democratic Party members of the New Hampshire House of Representatives
21st-century American politicians
Year of birth missing (living people)